Kim Carnes (born July 20, 1945) is an American singer and songwriter. She was born in Los Angeles and grew up there. She began her career as a songwriter in the 1960s, writing for other artists while performing in local clubs and working as a session background singer with the famed Water Sisters (featured in the documentary 20 Feet from Stardom). After she signed her first publishing deal with Jimmy Bowen, she released her debut album Rest on Me in 1971. Carnes' self-titled second album primarily contained self-penned songs, including her first charting single "You're a Part of Me", which reached No. 35 on the Billboard Adult Contemporary chart in 1975. In the following year, Carnes released Sailin', which featured "Love Comes from Unexpected Places". The song won the American Song Festival and the award for Best Composition at the Tokyo Song Festival in 1976.

In her breakthrough year, 1980, Carnes was commissioned by Kenny Rogers to co-write the songs for his concept album Gideon (1980), and their duet "Don't Fall in Love with a Dreamer" hit No. 4 on the Billboard Hot 100, and earned the duo a Grammy Award nomination. Later that year, her cover of Smokey Robinson's "More Love", from her fifth album Romance Dance (1980), hit No. 10. The following year, Carnes released Mistaken Identity, which featured the worldwide hit, "Bette Davis Eyes". It became the best-selling single of the year in the United States, spending nine weeks at No. 1 on the Billboard Hot 100, going Gold, and won the Grammy Award for Record of the Year and Song of the Year. Mistaken Identity reached No. 1 on the Billboard 200, was certified Platinum, and was nominated for the Grammy Award for Album of the Year.

Carnes also had success with the singles "Draw of the Cards" (No. 28), "Does It Make You Remember" (No. 36), "Crazy in the Night (Barking at Airplanes)" (No. 15), "Make No Mistake, He's Mine" (No. 51), with Barbra Streisand, "What About Me?" (No. 15), with Kenny Rogers and James Ingram, "I'll Be Here Where the Heart Is", from the Flashdance soundtrack, and the Grammy Award nominated singles "Voyeur" (No. 29) and "Invisible Hands" (No. 40). Her other successes as a songwriter include co-writing the No. 1 duet "The Heart Won't Lie" with Donna Weiss (who had co-written "Bette Davis Eyes" with Jackie DeShannon); it was recorded by Vince Gill and Reba McEntire, and released on McEntire's 1993 album It's Your Call.

Her distinctive, raspy vocal style has drawn comparisons to Rod Stewart. Her most recent studio album is Chasin' Wild Trains (2004). As of 2017, Carnes was residing in Nashville and continues to write music.

Early life
Kim Carnes was born on July 20, 1945, in Los Angeles. Her father, James Raymond Carnes, was an attorney and her mother was a hospital administrator. Kim Carnes knew she would be a singer and songwriter from the age of three, despite the fact that she was not born into a musical family. "My mother didn't get my career, and my father, who was an attorney, didn't think singing and writing was even a job." As a four-year-old, Carnes "married" her next-door neighbor musician David Lindley. She grew up in Pasadena, California and graduated from San Marino High School in 1963.

Career

1962–1974: Early career and first studio album
Kim Carnes was a songwriter and performer from an early age. After writing songs for many years, Carnes signed her first publishing deal in 1962 with producer Jimmy Bowen. During this period, she shared demo-recording time with Bowen's other writers, including Don Henley, Glenn Frey, and J.D. Souther. Carnes also sang "Nobody Knows", written by Mike Settle, which was featured in the end credits of the 1971 film Vanishing Point. The film also featured Carnes' first cut as a songwriter, "Sing Out for Jesus", which was recorded by Willie Mae "Big Mama" Thornton.

Also in 1971, she and Mike Settle again worked with Bowen to create the bubblegum pop studio group The Sugar Bears. The album Presenting the Sugar Bears and three singles were released with the song "You Are the One", reaching No. 83 on the Billboard charts.

In the early 1970s, Carnes and husband Dave Ellingson co-wrote several songs with David Cassidy who was then at the peak of his career as an international idol. Carnes toured the world with Cassidy as an opening act with her husband. Cassidy's albums Rock Me Baby, Dreams are Nuthin' More than Wishes, and Cassidy Live! include several songs penned by Carnes along with Ellingson and Cassidy. Carnes also provided backing vocals for these albums.

After signing with Amos Records, her first solo album Rest on Me was released in 1971. It was produced by Jimmy Bowen.

1975–1979: Early chart successes
In 1975, Carnes released her self-titled second album, which contained her first charted hit, "You're A Part Of Me", which reached No. 32 on the US Adult Contemporary charts. Carnes re-recorded this track with Gene Cotton three years later. The majority of tracks on this second album were written by Carnes and Ellingson.

Her third album Sailin' was produced by Jerry Wexler and released in 1976. One track, "Love Comes from Unexpected Places", won Grand Prize at the 1976 American Song Festival. The song also earned the award for Best Composition at the Tokyo Song Festival. It gained additional notice after it was recorded by Barbra Streisand on her 1977 album Superman. Streisand also recorded Carnes's "Stay Away" on her 1978 album Songbird. In spite of Streisand's endorsement of her material, Carnes's own Top 40 breakthrough did not occur until 1978 when Gene Cotton recruited her to record a duet version of "You're a Part of Me", which reached No. 36 on the Billboard Hot 100.

In 1979, she recorded a single using the pseudonym Connie con Carne titled "She Dances with Meat", written by herself and Dave Ellingson.

1980–1981: Collaboration with Kenny Rogers and "Bette Davis Eyes"
In 1980, her duet with Kenny Rogers "Don't Fall in Love with a Dreamer" became a major hit on the Pop (No. 4), Country (No. 3) and Adult Contemporary (No. 2) charts. The song was culled from Rogers' concept album Gideon, written entirely by Carnes and her husband Dave Ellingson. Later that year, her cover version of the Smokey Robinson & The Miracles song "More Love" became her first solo top 10 hit (number 10 in the pop charts and number six in the Adult Contemporary charts). Robinson was, indeed, so impressed with Carnes's recording and success with the song that he later wrote and composed "Being with You" for her. However Robinson's then producer George Tobin insisted instead that he record and release the song himself. "The record that went number one for me is a demo for Kim," Robinson told The Huffington Post. In 1981, Carnes provided backing vocals on Dionne Warwick's No Night So Long album.

In 1981, Carnes recorded the Jackie DeShannon and Donna Weiss song "Bette Davis Eyes", originally written and composed in 1974. As the first single released from the album Mistaken Identity, it spent nine weeks at number one on the U.S. singles charts and became a worldwide hit. The song's success propelled the album to number one on the Billboard 200 for four weeks. The single became the biggest hit of the entire year for 1981, and is second only to Olivia Newton-John's "Physical" as the biggest hit of the 1980s in the U.S., according to Billboard. The song earned both the Record of the Year and Song of the Year awards at the 1982 Grammy Awards. Carnes was nominated for Best Pop Female, and Mistaken Identity also earned a nomination for Album of the Year. Two follow-up singles were released from the album, the title track and "Draw of the Cards", which also charted in the UK and Australia.

Carnes and her band rehearsed "Bette Davis Eyes" in the studio for three days to take the melody and overall sound of the record to a darker, more haunting place. Keyboard player Bill Cuomo came up with the signature instrumental lick and together with the band and producer Val Garay created a completely new arrangement of the song, recorded the next day with no overdubs.

Bette Davis admitted to being a fan of the song and approached Carnes and the songwriters to thank them. Davis wrote to Carnes after the song was released, saying she loved the song. "It was a thrill to become a part of the rock generation," she said in her memoir This 'N That. Davis' grandson Ashley told the screen legend she had "finally made it". Carnes and Davis struck up a special friendship, with the singer visiting her at her home several times before Davis' death in 1989. In what she considers a career highlight, Carnes performed the song live for Davis at a tribute to the legendary actress held just before her death. More recently, the song was used in a 2008 Clairol Nice 'n Easy TV commercial in the United Kingdom, and the ad featuring the song expanded into South Africa and other territories around the world. In 2008, the song was featured in the opening scene of the documentary film Valentino: The Last Emperor and continues to be licensed for film and TV use. In November 2015, the song was the set piece for the back-story of Liz Taylor in the TV anthology American Horror Story: Hotel.

Also on 19 December 1981, Kim Carnes performed with Rod Stewart and Tina Turner at the L. A. Forum in Inglewood, California. Dick Clark hosted a television special version of the concert.

1982–1985: Voyeur and further releases
Carnes' later hits included two more singles that just missed the pop top 10: "Crazy in the Night" (from Barking at Airplanes) and "What About Me?" with Kenny Rogers and James Ingram. Kim also reached the Adult Contemporary Top 10 four times after "Bette Davis Eyes"–with "I Pretend" (No. 9), "What About Me?" (No. 1), "Make No Mistake, He's Mine" with Barbra Streisand (No. 8) (co-produced by Carnes with Bill Cuomo) and "Crazy in Love" (No. 10). On January 19, 1985, Carnes had the distinction of being on the Billboard Hot 100 with three singles simultaneously, "What About Me", "Make No Mistake, He's Mine", and "Invitation to Dance" from the soundtrack to the film That's Dancing! It meant she was on the chart as a solo artist in addition to being part of a duo and a trio.

Carnes was nominated for additional Grammy Awards–including Best Rock Vocal Performance Female for Voyeur, in 1983 and Best Rock Vocal Performance Female for "Invisible Hands" in 1984. In 1983, Carne's song "I'll Be Here Where the Heart Is" was included on the Flashdance soundtrack which received a Grammy for Best Album of Original Score Written for a Motion Picture. Carnes was also one of the singers invited to perform on USA for Africa's 1985 famine relief fundraising single "We Are the World" and can be seen in the music video and heard singing the last line of the song's bridge with Huey Lewis and Cyndi Lauper ("While we stand together as one"). In 1987, she sang the song "My Heart Has a Mind of Its Own" in a duet with Jeffrey Osborne for the soundtrack to the movie Spaceballs. In the same year, Carnes recorded "The Heart Must Have a Home" for the American film Summer Heat.

1988–1993: Return to Nashville and Japanese releases
Carnes reunited with producer Jimmy Bowen for her eleventh album View from the House, released in July 1988. It peaked at no. 36 on the Billboard Top Country Albums chart. Featuring session musicians including Vince Gill and Lyle Lovett, the album was described as a return to the country and folk influences of her early albums. "Crazy in Love" was released as the album's lead single, peaking at no. 13 on Billboard'''s Adult Contemporary chart.

In the early 1990s, Carnes released a series of tracks exclusively in Japan, including "Shiny Day" for a compilation album titled Re-Import, and "Hold Me" for a tribute album to the Japanese singer Seiko Matsuda. Carnes' twelfth studio album Checkin' Out the Ghosts was released exclusively in Japan in March 1991. Carnes recorded a cover of the Everly Brothers' song "Love Hurts" for the soundtrack to the Japanese film Private Lessons II.

Later in 1991, Carnes recorded the single "Hooked on the Memory of You" as a duet with Neil Diamond for his album Lovescape. A second track titled "Hard Times for Lovers" was released as a bonus track. In 1992, Diamond released a compilation album titled The Greatest Hits: 1966–1992 which featured a third duet with Carnes, a cover of "Heartbreak Hotel".

In 1993, Carnes released Gypsy Honeymoon: The Best of Kim Carnes. The title track peaked at no. 65 in Germany.

In 1997, Carnes co-wrote "Just One Little Kiss" with Greg Barnhill for Lila McCann's debut album Lila.

1994–present: Further songwriting success and Chasin' Wild Trains
In 1994, Carnes permanently moved from Los Angeles to Nashville. Throughout the 90s, she continued to write songs for other artists. "The Heart Won't Lie" became a US Country no. 1 hit for Reba McEntire and Vince Gill, and was nominated for Single of the Year at the TNN Music City News Country Awards in 1994.

In 1997, Carnes recorded a cover of "Bad, Bad Leroy Brown" for a tribute album to Jim Croce. Numerous country artists recorded Carnes' songs in the late 90s and early 2000s, including Smokie's version of "When the Walls Come Down" for Wild Horses – The Nashville Album (1998), Tim McGraw's version of "You Don't Love Me Anymore" for A Place in the Sun (1999), and Collin Raye's version of "Gypsy Honeymoon" for Can't Back Down (2001). Carnes provided backing vocals on the latter two recordings.

In June 2004, Carnes released her thirteenth and latest studio album, Chasin' Wild Trains, featuring songs co-written with Angelo Petraglia, Matraca Berg, Kim Richey, Al Anderson, Jeffrey Steele, Marc Jordan, Anders Osborne, and Chuck Prophet. The album was noted for its Americana and alt-country influences; it was compared to the musical styles of Stevie Nicks, Lucinda Williams and Melissa Etheridge. In the same year, Carnes provided backing vocals for two tracks on Tim McGraw's album Live Like You Were Dying.

Throughout the 2000s Carnes continued to write and record songs for movie soundtracks, including "Ring of Fire" with Jeff Bridges for The Contender (2000), "The Silver Cord" for Loggerheads (2005), and "It's a Mighty Hand" for Chances: The Women of Magdalene (2006).

In 2007, Carnes recorded "It's Clear Sky Again Today" for a tribute album to the Japanese singer-songwriter Noriyuki Makihara, and a cover of the Rolling Stones' song "Tumbling Dice" with Jill Johnson for her album Music Row. Subsequent songwriting credits include "Enough" for Dana Cooper on his album The Conjurer (2010), "Live to Tell" for Alyssa Reid's album The Game (2011), and three tracks for the Australian country duo O'Shea.

In October 2012, American label Culture Factory reissued Carnes' Mistaken Identity, Voyeur and Cafe Racers albums. Light House and Barking at Airplanes followed in August 2013. In 2013, Carnes featured in an episode of the LMN series The Haunting of....

In 2015, Carnes recorded "Under My Thumb" by The Rolling Stones for 80s Re:Covered, a conceptual compilation album featuring 80s-influenced covers of songs from the 1970s. In the following year, Carnes featured on the track "To Be with You Again" from Frankie Miller's duets album, Double Take.

In 2021, Carnes performed at the Rheneypalooza Jam, an online concert and auction to raise funds for St. Jude Children's Research Hospital in Memphis.

Artistry

Musical and vocal style
Carnes' voice has been described as "distinctively raspy" and "throaty", leading to comparisons to the voices of Rod Stewart and Bonnie Tyler. In 1993, Keith Tuber of Orange Coast magazine referred to Carnes as "The Queen of Rasp 'n' Roll" in one of his articles.

Personal life
Carnes resides in Nashville with husband Dave Ellingson (1967–present). She has two sons, Collin and Ry. Her son Ry, who is named after musician Ry Cooder, accompanies her vocally on the song "Rough Edges" from her album Barking at Airplanes. Her son Collin is featured on this album at the beginning of the song "Crazy in the Night". Collin co-wrote, with his mother, the songs "Divided Hearts", "Gypsy Honeymoon", "Don't Cry Now", and "River of Memories".

Awards

Grammy Awards
The Grammy Awards are awarded annually by The Recording Academy of the United States for outstanding achievements in the music industry. Often considered the highest music honour, the awards were established in 1958. Carnes has won two awards, from eight nominations.

{| class="wikitable"
|-
! colspan="6" align="center"| Grammy Awards
|-
! Year
! style="width:375px;" | Work
! style="width:525px;" | Award
! width="65" | Result
! width="20" | Ref
|-
| 1981
| "Don't Fall in Love with a Dreamer" (with Kenny Rogers)
| Best Pop Vocal Performance by a Duo, Group or Chorus
| 
| align="center"|
|-
| rowspan="3"| 1982
| Mistaken Identity
| Album of the Year
| 
| rowspan="3" align="center"|
|-
| rowspan="2"| "Bette Davis Eyes"
| Record of the Year
| 
|-
| Best Pop Vocal Performance, Female
| 
|-
| 1983
| Voyeur
| Best Rock Vocal Performance, Female
| 
| align="center"|
|-
| rowspan="3"| 1984
| rowspan="2"| Flashdance: Original Soundtrack from the Motion Picture
| Album of the Year
| 
| rowspan="3" align="center"|
|-
| Best Album of Original Score Written for a Motion Picture or a Television Special
| 
|-
| "Invisible Hands"
| Best Rock Vocal Performance, Female
| 
|-

 "Bette Davis Eyes" also won the Grammy Award for Song of the Year. This win is credited to songwriters Donna Weiss and Jackie DeShannon.
 "What About Me?" was nominated for the Grammy Award for Best Vocal Arrangement for Two or More Voices in 1984. The nomination is credited to arranger David Foster.
 Carnes was one of the various artists featured on the single "We Are the World", which won four Grammy Awards in 1986, including Record of the Year and Song of the Year.

Other awards

Discography 

 1971: Rest on Me
 1975: Kim Carnes
 1976: Sailin'
 1979: St. Vincent's Court
 1980: Romance Dance
 1981: Mistaken Identity
 1982: Voyeur
 1983: Café Racers
 1985: Barking at Airplanes
 1986: Light House
 1988: View from the House
 1991: Checkin' Out the Ghosts
 2004: Chasin' Wild Trains

References

External links

 
 

1945 births
Living people
American women country singers
American women singer-songwriters
American women rock singers
American country singer-songwriters
American folk singers
American pop rock singers
American soft rock musicians
Musicians from Los Angeles
Grammy Award winners
Singer-songwriters from California
20th-century American singers
21st-century American singers
20th-century American women singers
21st-century American women singers
Country musicians from California
The New Christy Minstrels members